Tim Mooney (October 6, 1958 – June 13, 2012) was an American drummer, producer, and sound engineer. He drummed in the Sleepers, Toiling Midgets, Negative Trend, Sun Kil Moon and American Music Club.

Musical career
In the 1970s and 1980s, Mooney played drums for a number of San Francisco punk and rock bands for The Sleepers (San Francisco band), Toiling Midgets, Negative Trend, and many others. Mooney became a member of American Music Club in 1991. His last album with the band was Love Songs for Patriots (2004), which he also produced and engineered. In 1998, Tim married Jude Mooney and had his only child, Dixie Mooney in 2000. Mooney moved to Petaluma, California in 1999. On June 13, 2012, Mooney passed away at age 53 due to complications from a heart attack. He was mourned by his former bandmates Mark Eitzel and Mark Kozelek.

In popular culture
Mooney's death is directly referenced by former Sun Kil Moon bandmate Mark Kozelek on the song "Tavoris Cloud" from his studio album Mark Kozelek & Desertshore, and on the song "Last Night I Rocked the Room Like Elvis and Had Them Laughing Like Richard Pryor" from Sun Kil Moon and Jesu's Jesu/Sun Kil Moon.

Discography
 Love Songs for Patriots (2004) – drummer, guitarist, producer, engineer
 The Green Door by The Green Door (2011) – producer and engineer

References

1958 births
2012 deaths
American indie rock musicians
American rock drummers
Musicians from Las Vegas
American Music Club members
Sun Kil Moon members